In My Heart may refer to:

In My Heart  (2020 film), Malaysian Mandarin-language romance drama film
In My Heart (Texas song)
In My Heart (Moby song)
"In My Heart", single by B. J. Thomas,	Tim Krekel 1979
"In My Heart", single by Barbara and the Browns,  	Steve Cropper, Deanie Parker	 	1964
"In My Heart", song by Cornell Campbell	- 1977
"In My Heart", single by Damita Jo,	Rose Marie McCoy, Charles Singleton 1955
"In My Heart", single by Derrick Morgan,	  Prince Buster 	1962
"In My Heart", single by Dianne Brooks, Harvey Brooks	1967
"In My Heart", song by Lou Rawls,	J. W. Alexander, Sam Cooke 1961, Johnny Morisette 1960
"In My Heart", song by The Maytals,	1968
"In My Heart", single by Roy Castle,	Tepper, Bennett 1958  Carl Dobkins, Jr.	 1960
"In My Heart", song by Scott Garrett, Eisner, Weiss	1958